The  was developed to carry the 130 mm rocket system developed by the Aerospace Division of the Nissan Motor Company. It used the suspension, tracks and diesel engine of the Type 73 Armored Personnel Carrier. Komatsu was responsible for the chassis and IHI Aerospace, as Nissan's Aerospace Division has since been renamed, for the launcher and its rockets. 15 Type 75 wind measurement vehicles were built on the same chassis to provide weather information for the rockets.

In 2001 Japan reported to the United Nations Office for Disarmament Affairs that 61 Type 75s were in service as well as 13 wind measurement vehicles. It is being gradually replaced by American designed license-built 227 mm M270 Multiple Launch Rocket System. According to Jane's only about 20 are left in service as of 2008.

Description
The Type 75 has a welded aluminum hull, with a crew of three (driver, commander and operator) sitting towards the front of the vehicle, with the driver sitting on the left, the commander on the right and the rocket operator sitting behind the commander. A single 12.7 mm (0.5 in) M2 Browning anti-aircraft machine gun mounted on the commander's hatch. A launcher for 30 rockets is fitted on the rear of the vehicle's hull. They can be fired individually or in a 12-second ripple.

Notes

References 
 Chant, Christopher. A Compendium of Armaments and Military Hardware. New York and London: Routledge & Kegan Paul, 1987 , p. 120-1

External links
 an excerpt from Jane's Armour and Artillery 2008

Japan Ground Self-Defense Force
Tracked self-propelled rocket launchers
Artillery of Japan
Military vehicles introduced in the 1970s